Spaghetti is a long thin form of pasta.

Spaghetti or spaghetto may also refer to:

Spaghetti
 Spaghetti (film), a 1916 film starring Oliver Hardy
 Spaghetti squash, a fruit
 Spaghetti code, in software
 Spaghetti plot, a method of showing possible flows through systems 
 Spaghetti Western, a genre of films produced by Italian production companies in the 1960s
 Spaghetti Records, a record label
 Spaghetti sort, a sorting algorithm.

Spaghetto
 Diana Manfredi aka "Spaghetto"

People
Tony "Spaghetti" Eustace (b. 1948), Australian fugitive was found murdered in 1985

See also
 Spaghetti tree, a 1957 BBC April Fools' Day hoax
 Flying Spaghetti Monster, a religion (or pseudoreligion)
 Spaghetti Junction, one of several highway junctions, nicknamed due to their complexity
 "The Spaghetti Incident?", a cover album by Guns N' Roses
 The Spaghetti Family, an animated television series